Petar Ivanov Debarliev (born 19 June 1991) is a Bulgarian footballer who plays as a goalkeeper for Bulgarian First League club Hebar.

Club career
In June 2017, he joined Hebar Pazardzhik.

References

External links

https://www.whoscored.com/Players/441612/Show/P-Debarliev
https://a-pfg.com/%D1%84%D1%83%D1%82%D0%B1%D0%BE%D0%BB%D0%B8%D1%81%D1%82/%D0%BF%D0%B5%D1%82%D1%8A%D1%80-%D0%B4%D0%B5%D0%B1%D1%8A%D1%80%D0%BB%D0%B8%D0%B5%D0%B2/
https://sportal.bg/news-2022072917390269881

1991 births
Living people
Sportspeople from Bjelovar
Bulgarian footballers
Association football midfielders
FC Hebar Pazardzhik players
First Professional Football League (Bulgaria) players